Legal charge may refer to:

Business
 Security interest

Law
 Information (formal criminal charge), a formal charge in a common law court
 Indictment, a count, a formal charge by a court
 Criminal accusation